The 1920 Maine Black Bears football team was an American football team that represented the University of Maine during the 1920 college football season. In its second season under head coach James A. Baldwin, the team compiled a 3–3–3 record.  Raymond Smith was the team captain.

Schedule

References

Maine
Maine Black Bears football seasons
Maine Black Bears football